Jaén Fútbol Sala is a futsal club based in Jaén, city of the autonomous community of Andalusia.

The club was established in 1980 and its pavilion is the Olivo Arena with capacity of 6,500 seats since 2021.

History
In May 2013, Fuconsa Jaén achieved its third promotion to Primera División in its history. Its last promotion to Primera División occurred in 1999.

In March 2015, Jaén Paraíso Interior, won its first national title after defeating FC Barcelona in the final of the Copa de España, played in Ciudad Real, by 6–4.

Sponsors
CajaSur - (1992–1993)
Cánava - (1993–1994)
Alvic - (1995–1997)
Paraíso Interior - (1997–2000)
Real Jaén - (2000–2003)
Paraíso Interior - (2006–2010)
Fuconsa - (2010–2013)
Paraíso Interior - (2013–)

Current squad

Season to season

8 seasons in Primera División
10 seasons in Segunda División
7 seasons in Segunda División B
1 seasons in Tercera División

Honours
Copa de España: 2
2015, 2018

References

External links
Official Website
Profile at LNFS.es

Futsal clubs in Spain
Sports teams in Andalusia
Futsal clubs established in 1980
1980 establishments in Spain
Sport in Jaén, Spain